Song Wenbin (born 5 January 1963) is a Chinese biathlete. He competed at the 1984 Winter Olympics and the 1992 Winter Olympics.

References

External links
 

1963 births
Living people
Chinese male biathletes
Olympic biathletes of China
Biathletes at the 1984 Winter Olympics
Biathletes at the 1992 Winter Olympics
Sportspeople from Liaoning
Asian Games medalists in biathlon
Biathletes at the 1990 Asian Winter Games
Asian Games gold medalists for China
Asian Games silver medalists for China
Medalists at the 1990 Asian Winter Games